Echo Mountain is a mountain promontory of the San Gabriel Mountains, in the Angeles National Forest above Altadena, in Los Angeles County, California.

Geography

Echo Mountain was shaped from an alluvial fan between Rubio and Las Flores canyons. It is geographically defined by Castle Canyon to its leeward side, Rubio Canyon at its foot, and Las Flores Canyon on its windward side. It is most visible as a short mountain extension whose ridge protrudes below the peak of Inspiration Point.

Echo Mountain's name is derived from the number of repetitions one's voice could emit into Castle Canyon. Boy Scout projects were made to find the "sweet spot" where the largest number of repetitions could be heard. During the days of the Mount Lowe Railway "echophones" were set up to assist in voice projections near the best sweet spots.

History

On 6 January 1993, Echo Mountain, also referred to as Mount Echo, was delineated as part of the Mount Lowe Railway monument area listed  by the U.S. Forest Service on the National Register of Historic Places. On top of the mountain are the ruins of "White City", a resort along the scenic Mount Lowe Railway, which could easily be seen from the valley below. From its point and down an incline to its foot in Rubio Canyon was the Great Incline funicular of the Mount Lowe Railway, whose white cars could be seen ascending and descending Echo.

Trail access
Echo Mountain can be reached by the Sam Merrill Trail located at the top of Lake Avenue, or via the fire road which extends from Millard Canyon to a point along the old right of way, which will lead to the backside of the promontory.

References

External links
 
 
 

San Gabriel Mountains
Mountains of Los Angeles County, California
Altadena, California
Angeles National Forest
Mountains of Southern California